Sennindani Dam is a gravity dam located in Toyama prefecture in Japan. The dam is used for power production. The catchment area of the dam is 284.1 km2. The dam impounds about 6  ha of land when full and can store 682 thousand cubic meters of water. The construction of the dam was started on 1936 and completed in 1940.

References

Dams in Toyama Prefecture
1940 establishments in Japan